Edmentum is an American online learning provider and owner of Reading Eggs internationally. 

Founded in 2000 as Archipelago Learning, the company is headquartered in Dallas, Texas, and is a publicly held company with the largest shareholder being Providence Equity Partners, a media focused private equity firm. The company went public in November 2009 under the ticker. On 17 May 2012, Archipelago Learning was acquired by PLATO Learning in an all-cash deal valued at $291 million. As a result, the stock was delisted.

Business products
The company sells a suite of supplemental educational software products.

Study Island is the company's best-known product and website. It is available in two versions: Study Island for Home, for the home market, and Study Island for Schools, for the educational market.
The brand was launched in 2000.

EducationCity is a developer and publisher of online educational learning with offices in Chicago, USA and Rutland, UK. 
Archipelago acquired the firm in June 2010.

History
Study Island was founded in May 2000 by Cam Chalmers and Dave Muzzo, originally providing tools related to the Ohio Proficiency Test Program. By 2002, Study Island had expanded to four states, Ohio, North Carolina, New York, and Michigan and serviced 180 schools. Continuing its rapid growth plan, Study Island, which moved its offices to Dallas, Texas added six states in 2003 and expanded its coverage to 750 schools.

In January 2007, Providence Equity Partners and MHT Partners together with co-founders Cameron Chalmers and David Muzzo completed a recapitalization of Study Island in which Archipelago Learning was created to acquire 100% of the outstanding shares of Study Island.

In June 2008, the company acquired TeacherWeb and in August 2009 the company acquired a minority interest in Edline, a private educational technology company. Also, in April 2009, the company launched Northstar Learning, marking its first entry into the postsecondary education market.

In October 2009, it launched in Canada.

In November 2009, Archipelago Learning launched a $75 million initial public offering on the NASDAQ under the symbol "ARCL". It also sold TeacherWeb in November 2009.

In June 2010, it bought EducationCity expanding the company's school count and portfolio of products in the U.S. and providing an entry point into the U.K. Later that summer the company entered into a distribution agreement with Blake Publishing, and in August 2010 began selling Reading Eggs in the U.S. and Canada.

In June 2011, they acquired Alloy Multimedia, the publisher of ESL ReadingSmart, an English language learning program.

On 17 May 2012, Archipelago Learning was purchased by PLATO Learning (Now Edmentum, Inc) at the price of US$11.10 per share.

References

External links
 

Educational technology companies of the United States
Education companies established in 2000
Software companies based in Texas
Private equity portfolio companies
Providence Equity Partners companies
Software companies of the United States